The 1942 Iowa gubernatorial election was held on November 3, 1942. Republican nominee Bourke B. Hickenlooper defeated Democratic nominee Nelson G. Kraschel with 62.75% of the vote.

Primary elections
Primary elections were held on June 1, 1942.

Democratic primary

Candidates 
Nelson G. Kraschel, former Governor
Earl Miller
A. E. Augustine , State Senator

Results

Republican primary

Candidates
Bourke B. Hickenlooper, incumbent Lieutenant Governor

Results

General election

Candidates
Major party candidates
Bourke B. Hickenlooper, Republican
Nelson G. Kraschel, Democratic 

Other candidates
Ward Hall, Prohibition
F. M. Briggs, Independent

Results

References

1942
Iowa
Gubernatorial